Ewald Burian (12 July 1896 – 3 November 1981) was a highly decorated Oberst in the Wehrmacht during World War II. He was also a recipient of the Knight's Cross of the Iron Cross. The Knight's Cross of the Iron Cross was awarded to recognise extreme battlefield bravery or successful military leadership.

Awards and decorations
 Honour Cross of the World War 1914/1918
 Iron Cross (1939)
 2nd Class (1 April 1942)
 1st Class (1 August 1942)
 Infantry Assault Badge (3 June 1942)
 Eastern Front Medal (21 July 1942)
 German Cross in Gold (21 October 1943)
 Knight's Cross of the Iron Cross on 4 October 1944 as Oberst and commander of Grenadier-Regiment 980

References

Citations

Bibliography

 
 
 

1896 births
1981 deaths
Military personnel from Chernivtsi
People from the Duchy of Bukovina
Austro-Hungarian military personnel of World War I
Recipients of the Gold German Cross
Recipients of the Knight's Cross of the Iron Cross
Austrian prisoners of war
World War I prisoners of war held by Italy